The 1928 Australian Championships was a tennis tournament that took place on outdoor Grass courts at the White City Tennis Club, Sydney, Australia from 21 January to 6 February. It was the 21st edition of the Australian Championships (now known as the Australian Open), the 5th held in Sydney, and the first Grand Slam tournament of the year. The singles titles were won by Frenchman Jean Borotra and Australian Daphne Akhurst.

Nineteen-year-old Australian, Jack Crawford reached the semi-finals, where he was beaten by Borotra.

This was the first of only four such a Grand Slam tournaments, in which a Triple Crown was achieved by two players.

Finals

Men's singles

 Jean Borotra defeated  Jack Cummings  6–4, 6–1, 4–6, 5–7, 6–3

Women's singles

 Daphne Akhurst defeated  Esna Boyd 7–5, 6–2

Men's doubles

 Jean Borotra /  Jacques Brugnon defeated  Gar Moon /  Jim Willard 6–2, 4–6, 6–4, 6–4

Women's doubles

 Daphne Akhurst /  Esna Boyd defeated  Kathleen Le Messurier /  Dorothy Weston 6–3, 6–1

Mixed doubles

 Daphne Akhurst /  Jean Borotra defeated  Esna Boyd /  Jack Hawkes walkover

Notes

References

External links
 Australian Open official website

1928 in tennis
1928
1928 in Australian tennis
January 1928 sports events
 
February 1928 sports events